Buchenavia kleinii is a species of plant in the Combretaceae family. It is endemic to Brazil.  It is threatened by habitat loss.

References

Flora of Brazil
kleinii
Near threatened plants
Taxonomy articles created by Polbot
Taxobox binomials not recognized by IUCN